The International Goya Award (Spanish: Premio Goya Internacional) is one of the Goya Awards, Spain's principal national film awards. First awarded in 2022, it is a non-competitive award that honors "artists that have contributed to cinema as a medium that brings together different cultures and people".

Laureates

2020s

References

External links 
Official site
IMDb: Goya Awards

International